Fedor Rudakov (born 28 April 1994) is a visually impaired Russian Paralympic athlete who specializes in middle-distance running. He represented Russian Paralympic Committee athletes at the 2020 Summer Paralympics.

Career
Rudakov represented Russian Paralympic Committee athletes at the 2020 Summer Paralympics in the men's 1500 m T11 event and won a bronze medal.

References

1994 births
Living people
Medalists at the World Para Athletics European Championships
Medalists at the World Para Athletics Championships
Paralympic athletes of Russia
Athletes (track and field) at the 2020 Summer Paralympics
Medalists at the 2020 Summer Paralympics
Paralympic medalists in athletics (track and field)
Paralympic bronze medalists for the Russian Paralympic Committee athletes
Russian male middle-distance runners
20th-century Russian people
21st-century Russian people